Giuseppe Colnago (15 December 1923 - 22 December 2000) was an Italian professional Grand Prix motorcycle road racer.

Born in Caponago, Colnago had his best year in 1955 when he won the 500cc Belgian Grand Prix and finished the season in fourth place in the 500cc world championship. He was one of the few people to race the famous Moto Guzzi V8 race bike.

References 

1923 births
2000 deaths
Sportspeople from the Province of Monza e Brianza
Italian motorcycle racers
350cc World Championship riders
500cc World Championship riders